Guangfu is a town in Yongnian District, Handan, Hebei, China.

Names

"Guangfu" is an elision of the town's older name Guangpingfu, referring to its former status as the seat of Guangping ("Expansively Pacified" or "Peaceful") Prefecture under the Ming. The name was first borne by the town under the Han.

By the Tang, it was known as Mingzhou from its former prefecture, itself named after the nearby Ming River. It has also been known as Yongnian ("Longevity") from the name of its former county and present district.

Geography
Guangfu is located in the middle of Yongnian Marsh in the western reaches of Handan's Yongnian District.

History

The area around Guangfu has been typically marshy since the earliest historical records. Guangfu itself was first settled during the Spring and Autumn Period around the 6thcenturyBC. It made up part of Jin during the Zhou, and part of Zhao during the Warring States Period. Under the Qin, it was organized as part of Handan Commandery.

During the fall of the Sui, it served as the capital of Dou Jiande's short-lived "Xia Principality" after he captured it in AD619. At the time, the city lay on the principal road running from points south of the Yellow River northeast to Youzhou (now within Beijing) and Korea. When Dou captured Li Shentong, the Prince of Huai'an, the Tang scion was held in Guangfu's prison. When Dou was captured at the 621 Battle of Hulao, a few hundred of his cavalry escaped to his capital, looted its treasury, and then yielded the town to the victorious Tang. After Dou was executed in Chang'an, his cavalry officer Liu Heita again rose in rebellion, defeating the Tang near Guangfu in late 621 with Turkic assistance. He then occupied the city and made it his capital, proclaiming his realm the "Principality of Handong". Li Shimin—the future Emperor Taizong—defeated him by erecting a dam across the nearby Ming River and then bursting it when it was able to flood most of the Handong army. Liu was able to return to the field with more Turkic help but again defeated. He was executed in Guangping's marketplace in the first month of 623. 

Guangfu's present city walls began as earthen ramparts during the Tang (7th–9thcenturies) and were built up with masonry under the Yuan (13th–14thcenturies) and Ming (14th–17thcenturies).

During the 19th century, under the Qing, it was the home to Yang Luchan and Wu Yuxiang, the founders of Yang and Wu-style tai chi, two of the largest schools of tai chi in the world. Horace William Houlding's South Chihli Mission opened a Protestant church in the town in 1905. It was overseen in its early years by Katharine Ewald.

The  historical area within the city walls has been refurbished since China's opening up, with current construction mimicking the town's appearance under the Ming. Yang and Wu's former homes have been converted into public museums honoring their lives and schools of tai chi. The town was named a AAAAA tourist attraction by China's National Tourism Administration in 2017.

In popular culture
The CCTV drama Guangfu Tai Chi (Guǎngfǔ Tàijí Chuánqí) was filmed on location in the city in 2007 and aired in 2010.

See also
 AAAAA Tourist Attractions of China

Notes

References

Citations

Bibliography
 .
 .
 . 
 .
 .
 .

External links

 GuangFutures by the University of Sheffield's School of Architecture
 Photographs of Guangfu Ancient City at Beautiful Places 4 You

Handan
Major National Historical and Cultural Sites in Hebei
AAAAA-rated tourist attractions
Populated places established in the 1st millennium BC
Township-level divisions of Hebei